Pako Guyot  is a guyot in the Pacific Ocean.

Name 

Geomorphology 

Former reefs occur on the seamount and during the Cretaceous and Eocene left mudstones and limestones on the seamount. Later, pelagic limestones were emplaced on them. A  large area on the northwestern corner of Pako Guyot's summit plateau is free of sediments.

Geology 

The guyot is part of the Magellan Seamounts. The seamount was volcanically active during the Cretaceous-Paleogene 91.3 million years ago and may have formed on a hotspot together with Ioah Guyot and Vlinder Guyot; a late phase of volcanism may have taken place in the Paleocene-Eocene. The hotspots that formed Pako Guyot were located in what is today French Polynesia.

Volcanic rocks dredged from Pako are of sodium-potassium hawaiitic and trachybasaltic composition and geochemically resemble these erupted by the Rarotonga hotspot. Clays with Cenomanian-age radiolarian fossils cover the entire lower slopes of Pako Guyot.

Biota 

Corals and squat lobsters have been found on the seamount. Ophiuroids, most of which are symbiotic with corals and sponges, live on the seamount and its flanks. Diverse communities including brittle stars, corals, fish, sea anemones, sea cucumbers, sea lilies, sea urchins, shrimp and starfish have been found at its feet, where organic matter accumulates. Ammonites lived on the seamount during the Cretaceous.

Mining 

The seamount features substantial deposits of ferromanganese and phosphorite ores. In 2014, China obtained a contract with the International Seabed Authority allowing for exploration of Pako Guyot for cobalt crusts.

See also 

 Ita Mai Tai

References 

Seamounts of the Pacific Ocean
Cretaceous volcanoes